The Southeast administrative region of the Missouri Department of Conservation encompasses Bollinger, Butler, Cape Girardeau, Dunklin, Iron, Madison, Mississippi, New Madrid, Pemiscot, Perry, Reynolds, Scott, Ste. Genevieve, St. Francois, Stoddard, and Wayne counties.  The regional conservation office is in Cape Girardeau.

Notes 

 Acreage and counties from MDCLand GIS file
 Names, descriptions, and locations from Conservation Atlas Online GIS file

References 

 
 

Southeast region